Alison Stone (born 1964) is an American poet.

Biography
Alison Stone grew up in Framingham, Massachusetts and graduated from Brandeis University with a degree in poetry.. Her work is published in eight full-length collections, and also appears in numerous publications including The Paris Review, Poetry, Ploughshares, Barrow Street, and Poet Lore. Two of her printed works are held in the permanent collection of the Poetry Foundation in Chicago, Illinois, and many of her poems appear in the foundation's online collection.

A licensed psychotherapist, Stone currently resides and practices in New York.

Awards
 LitSpace St. Petersburg Residency (2017) 
 New York Quarterly’s Madeline Sadin Award 
 Many Mountains Moving Poetry Award (2003) 
 Poetry Foundation's Frederick Bock Prize (1995)

Bibliography

Notes

References

20th-century American women writers
21st-century American poets
Poets from Massachusetts
American women poets
Jewish American poets
People from Framingham, Massachusetts
1964 births
Living people
21st-century American women writers
20th-century American poets
American psychotherapists
Brandeis University alumni